Samuel Walter Page (February 11, 1916 – May 29, 2002) was a Major League Baseball pitcher who played in  with the Philadelphia Athletics. He batted left and threw right-handed.

External links

1916 births
2002 deaths
Major League Baseball pitchers
Baseball players from South Carolina
Philadelphia Athletics players
People from Woodruff, South Carolina